East Avon is a hamlet and census-designated place (CDP) in the town of Avon, Livingston County, New York, United States. The population was 608 at the 2010 census.

History
The First Presbyterian Church of Avon, at the northeast corner of the central intersection in the hamlet, was added to the National Register of Historic Places in 2005.

Geography
East Avon is in northern Livingston County, in the northeastern part of the town of Avon. U.S. Route 20 and New York State Route 5 pass concurrently through the community, leading west  to the village of Avon and east  to Lima. State Route 15 crosses Routes 20 and 5 in the center of East Avon, leading south  to Lakeville and north  to Rochester. I-390 leads north to Rochester and south  to Interstate 86 in Avoca.

Demographics

References 

Hamlets in New York (state)
Census-designated places in New York (state)
Census-designated places in Livingston County, New York
Hamlets in Livingston County, New York